Iulia Bulie ( Bobeică, born 3 July 1967) is a retired Romanian rower who competed at the 1992 and 1996 Olympics and several world championships in the 1990s. She had her best achievements in the eights, winning an Olympic silver medal in 1992 and the world title in 1990 and 1993. She competed under her maiden name at the 1992 Olympics, and under Iulia Bulie at the 1996 Olympics.

References

External links
 
 
 
 

1967 births
Living people
People from Botoșani County
Romanian female rowers
Rowers at the 1992 Summer Olympics
Rowers at the 1996 Summer Olympics
Olympic silver medalists for Romania
Olympic rowers of Romania
World Rowing Championships medalists for Romania
Medalists at the 1992 Summer Olympics